Markin is a surname. In Slavic countries it is used only for males, while its feminine counterpart is Markina. It may refer to:

Aleksandr Markin (footballer) (1949–1996), Soviet Russian football player
Aleksandr Markin (hurdler) (born 1962), Soviet Russian track and field athlete
Allan Markin (born 1945), Canadian businessman and philanthropist
Boris Markin, Ukrainian sprint canoer
Evgeny Markin  (born 1975), Russian businessman, public figure and politician
Joseph Markin, Canadian lawyer and politician
Mariya Markina, Russian model 
Mikhail Markin (born 1993), Russian football striker
Morris Markin (1893–1970), Russian-born American businessman
Murray Markin (born c. 1949), Canadian politician
Nadezhda Markina (born 1959), Russian film actress
Rod Markin (born 1956), American laboratory automation pioneer
Sergei Vladimirovich Markin (born 1966), Russian football coach and a former player.
Valentin Markin (1903–1934), Soviet spy
Viktor Markin (born 1957), Russian sprinter